Rosie Leventon is a British visual artist whose practice spans sculpture, installation, land art, drawing and painting.  She is known for making sculptural installations that reference current issues as well as the natural environment, archaeology and vernacular architecture.

Work and career 

Leventon studied Chinese Language & Archaeology from 1974 to 1975 at London University, before completing her bachelor's degree in Fine Art from Croydon College of Art  1976-79  then a Post Graduate in Advanced Sculpture at Central St Martins School of Art  1980–81.

A recurring theme running through her artistic practice is that of things that have been lost, hidden, or forgotten. 

Leventon was commissioned by Stour Valley Arts to make two large earthworks  which are situated in Kings Wood in Stour Valley, Kent, and form part of the Stour Valley  Sculpture Trail alongside other artworks. Both pieces were shortlisted for the Rouse Kent Award for Public Art and Ring was the winner.  Made in 2004, it is a concave circular piece dug out of the  land itself, inspired by Anglo-Saxon barrow fields and prehistoric earthworks found in the local area in Kent. Usually filled with water, it also acts as a water source for deer in the forest. Leventon's second work in Kings Wood made in 2004 is B52, she chose this aircraft because it was the time of the Iraq war and it is  such a powerful symbol . Her idea was to subvert the destructive and aggressive power of the aircraft into a living growing piece - it  consists of a  clearing in the monoculture of coppiced sweet chestnut trees cut into the  negative shape of the American bomber . The cleared woodland allows light and  biodiversity onto the forest floor.

From 2014 Leventon was commissioned by the Woodland Trust to make a permanent Earthwork for the Queen Elizabeth Diamond Jubilee Woods situated in Normanton le Heath, Leicestershire, UK. The  form of this artwork responds to local prehistoric archaeology. Taking on the theme of time the work consists of a large corkscrew spiral structure which visitors can interact with by walking along the spiral path into the concave centre, which is surrounded by a ring of Oaks and Wild Service trees  and a further ring of bushes selected to be of particular value to birds.

Responding to a commission from the Dorset-based arts organisation b-side in 2018 Leventon produced an installation Endangered Dust for the courtyard of  Portland Museum. Part of an ongoing  series influenced by vernacular architecture, the form of Endangered Dust was inspired by prehistoric stone chambers cut into the rock in the Isle of Portland known as Beehive Chambers. Leventon's  work was constructed from layers of hand cut plywood taking the  conical beehive forms as its starting point, lit from the inside.

In 2000 she was commissioned to make a piece for the National Maritime Museum responding to the history of HMS Implacable, a Ship of the Line of which  only the salvaged stern and figurehead remained. Her piece Absentee is a ghostly re-creation of the ship made from hundreds of pieces of glass. It is now suspended in the Queens House at the side of the museum beside the Turner painting The Fighting Temeraire. It is now at the Museums storage facility at Kidbrooke pending reorganisation of some of the galleries.

Selected exhibitions 
UK exhibitions include:

Contemporary Sculpture Fulmer, Bucks, open until Spring 2024

Royal Academy Summer exhibition

Summer Exhibition, Royal Society of Sculptors, London, 2020

Endangered Dust, Felix & Spear Gallery, London, 2020

Trinity Buoy Wharf Prize. Orchard place London and touring - 2022-3, 2019 and 2000

Traces of Traces, Art at Broadgate, London, 2017 

Wells Art Contemporary, Wells cathedral.Composition 2.

Lichfield Festival of Visual Art Exhibition. Lichfield Cathedral.

Endangered Dust 2019( b-side Commission), Portland Museum, Isle of Portland, Dorset, 2018

Atrium Gallery  Exchange House, Broadgate Centre, Liverpool St Station London.

2 person show. Angus-Hughes Gallery, London, 2017

Centenary Open Exhibition 2013, The London Group. The Cello Factory, London, 2013

Unfold, Nettie Horn, London, 2009

Undercurrent, Fabrica, Brighton, 2004

Excavating the Present, Kettles Yard Gallery, Cambridge, 1991

Wake, Chisenhale Gallery, London, 1988

Forensic Evidence, Serpentine Gallery, London, 1987

International exhibitions include:

Up the Duff, Galleria L’Affiche, Milan and La Fortezza del Girifalco, Cortona, Italy, 2017 (touring show with Leandro Lottici) 

Arte Laguna Prize, Venice, 2016   

Brandts Klaedefabrik, Odense, Denmark 1991

Prague Festival of Contemporary Art. Czech Republic.2011 

Convergence Arts Festival, Rhode Island  USA.2003                                                             

Views (of the Museum), Museo d’Arte Contemporani Barcelona, Spain,1996

Centraline Museum, Lodz Poland.

Der Pfalzgalerie, KaisersLautern, Germany 1990

Awards include 

2021 Royal Society of Sculptors Spotlight Award.

2020 Felix & Spear Award.

Arts Council Awards 2003 

Rouse Kent Award for Public  Art,

Elephant Trust

British Council,

Mark Tanner Award for Sculpture,

Henry Moore Sculpture Trust.

UJADF ( UK / Japan Art Design & Film ) Winner. Installation

References 

Living people
1946 births
English contemporary artists